An independent politician is a person who has served in a political office while not affiliated to any political party. Many of these have either resigned or been expelled from membership in political parties, and some have gone on to form their own political parties over time.

Background
In Australia, the federal and state governments all operate on a bicameral parliament, with a House of Representatives and a Senate each. Control of each house is formed by either a majority parliament, where a single party or a coalition of parties, holds enough seats to hold power through an electoral term in their own right. When a party is unable to win enough seats in an election, this is known as a "hung parliament", the larger parties are required to meet with smaller third parties and independents in order to make compromises and agreements in order to have a majority of seats, known as forming a minority government. Most elections in Australian history have resulted in Majority governments. In every case where there have been minority governments, the balance of power has been predominantly in the hands of Independent members of parliament, meaning the individual is not attached to, or affiliated with, a political party.

There are numerous reasons why someone may stand for office as an independent:
 Parties only run a single candidate in the House of Representatives, in order to limit campaign costs and complexity. Some candidates attempt to become a candidate for a party in the pre-selection stage, and are unsuccessful. Instead of putting their support behind the successful pre-selectees, some choose to transition their efforts into an independent candidacy for office.
 Some independent politicians come from party backgrounds, and have either voluntarily withdrawn from parties due to factional or values-based misalignment or in protest of certain political actions, or have been removed by the party for similar reasons.
 Some independent politicians may not find enough common ground with the parties available, either from the positioning on the political spectrum, or the effectiveness in fulfilling their electoral mandate, and believe that standing apart from a party will prove more effective.
All politicians in Australia are still required to fulfil their obligations, if elected, regardless of whether they are independent or are part of a political party. All are also afforded the opportunity to speak on behalf of their electorate or district, if a member of the house of representatives, or state or region, if a member of the senate.

Federal
Before 2022 independents were not often elected to the federal Parliament of Australia. Historically independents were more commonly elected to state parliaments. In 2022 seven new independents were elected to the House of Representatives of whom only one was previously active in one of the traditional political parties. Historically, many independents were former members of one of Australia's main parties, the Australian Labor Party, the Liberal Party of Australia and the National Party of Australia. On 16 July 2013 a political party named the Australian Independents was registered with the Australian Electoral Commission. It was deregistered on 4 February 2016.

House of Representatives
As of 2022, eleven independents sit in the Australian House of Representatives: Andrew Gee from Calare in New South Wales, Andrew Wilkie from Clark in Tasmania (former Greens candidate), Helen Haines from Indi in Victoria, Zali Steggall from Warringah in New South Wales, Kate Chaney from Curtin in Western Australia, Zoe Daniel from Goldstein in Victoria, Dai Le from Fowler in New South Wales, Dr Monique Ryan from Kooyong in Victoria, Dr Sophie Scamps from Mackellar in New South Wales, Allegra Spender from Wentworth in New South Wales and Kylea Tink from North Sydney in New South Wales.

Casual vacancies in the House of Representatives of independent members are filled in the same way as for party members, i.e., by a by-election.

Won election as independent

Not elected as independent

Senate
Independent Senators are quite rare. In modern politics, independent Brian Harradine served from 1975 to 2005 with considerable influence at times. Nick Xenophon was an elected independent Senator from his election to the Senate at the 2007 federal election. Xenophon was re-elected for another six-year term at the 2013 federal election. He was re-elected at the 2016 double dissolution election under the Nick Xenophon Team. DLP Senator John Madigan became an independent Senator in September 2014, but failed to be re-elected at the 2016 election. PUP Senators Jacqui Lambie and Glenn Lazarus became independent Senators in November 2014 and March 2015. At the 2016 election, Lazarus lost his seat and Lambie was re-elected under the Jacqui Lambie Network. In the 2022 election, former rugby player David Pocock was elected as an independent Senator from the ACT, becoming the first independent Senator from a territory and the first non-major party member of parliament from the ACT. Pocock is  currently the only independent Senator.

On 21 May 1977, a referendum to amend Section 15 of the Constitution was approved to require future Senate casual vacancies to be filled by a member of the party represented by the former senator at the time of their election, if the state parliament chooses to fill the vacancy. However, this requirement does not apply to independent senators.

Won election or appointed as independent

Not elected as independent

States and territories

New South Wales

New South Wales Legislative Assembly

Won election as independent

Not elected as independent

New South Wales Legislative Council

Elected as independent

All of these MPs were indirectly elected by MPs under the former system between 1934 and 1978.

Not elected as independent

Victoria

Victorian Legislative Assembly

Won election as independent

Not elected as independent

Victorian Legislative Council

Not elected as independent

Queensland

Queensland Legislative Assembly

Won election as independent

Not elected as independent

Western Australia

Western Australian Legislative Assembly

Won election as independent

Not elected as independent

Western Australian Legislative Council

Won election as independent

Not elected as independent

South Australia

South Australian House of Assembly

Won election as independent

Not elected as independent

South Australian Legislative Council

Won election as independent

Not elected as independent

Tasmania

Upper house
Rosemary Armitage
Robert Armstrong
Ivan Dean
Kerry Finch
Ruth Forrest
Mike Gaffney
Greg Hall
Tony Mulder
Tania Rattray
Adriana Taylor
Rob Valentine
Jim Wilkinson

Australian Capital Territory

Australian Capital Territory Legislative Assembly

Won election as independent

Not elected as independent

Northern Territory

Northern Territory Legislative Assembly

Won election as independent

Not elected as independent

References

 
Political terminology in Australia
Independent